"Rumors" is a song by American rapper Gucci Mane featuring fellow American rapper Lil Durk. It was released through Atlantic and 1017 Records on January 25, 2022 as the lead single from Gucci's upcoming sixteenth studio album. The artists wrote the song with producers Tay Keith and DJ Meech. Gucci announced the song and its release date with a preview of it and its accompanying music video on January 24, 2022, the day before the song was released, referring to it as "a street smash". The two artists have previously collaborated on Gucci's 2014 song, "Wit Us", which is a remix of Durk's 2014 song, "War Wit Us".

Composition and lyrics
Lyrically, "Rumors" sees both Mane and Durk dismissing any rumors that have been made against them. Mane received attention for dissing Pookie Loc, a friend of American rapper Jeezy. Rapper 50 Cent commented about the diss on Instagram.

Music video
The official music video for "Rumors", directed by Jerry Sanchez, was released alongside the song on January 25, 2022. The video sees Mane and Durk rapping in a parking lot and hanging out with friends.

Personnel
Credits adapted from Tidal.

 Gucci Mane – lead vocals, songwriting
 Lil Durk – featured vocals, songwriting
 Tay Keith – production, songwriting
 DJ Meech – production, songwriting
 Eddie "eMIX" Hernandez – mixing
 Amani "A $" Hernandez – mixing assistance
 Colin Leonard – mastering

Charts

Certifications

Release history

References

2022 singles
2022 songs
Atlantic Records singles
Gucci Mane songs
Lil Durk songs
Songs written by Gucci Mane
Songs written by Lil Durk
Songs written by Tay Keith
Song recordings produced by Tay Keith